Collingwood College is a college of Durham University in England. It is the second largest of Durham's undergraduate colleges with around 1100 students. Founded in 1972 as the first purpose-built, mixed-sex college in Durham, it is named after the mathematician Sir Edward Collingwood (1900–70), who was a former Chair of the Council of Durham University.

History

Plans for Collingwood began in 1960, as part of a programme of expansion that included both Van Mildert College and Trevelyan College. By 1962 it was determined that the new college was to be built on the site of Oswald House, with Richard Sheppard (architect of Churchill College, Cambridge) being appointed the following year . The remnants of the Oswald House estate can be seen in the landscaped grounds and mature trees that surround the college. Over the following years a series of funding issues and debates over the student composition of the new college meant that building on the site did not begin until August 1971. It was determined that the new college should be called Collingwood College, a name chosen from a shortlist of three (the others being Cromwell College and Lumley College). With building not being complete until 1973, Collingwood's first 66 freshers were housed in Van Mildert from October 1972!

Buildings and facilities

The college is located to the south of Durham city centre, on South Road. The steep incline of this road leads to Collingwood and the surrounding colleges being commonly referred to as 'Hill' colleges. Extended in 1994, Collingwood now has over a thousand students allocated to it, and approximately 550 bed spaces within the college. Accommodation is provided within three main wings: the original Durham and Northumbria wings and the newer, en-suite Cumbria wing. A separate block, York, is located away from the others and consists of flats used by fellows of the College and of the Institute of Advanced Study. Not all students live in college during their time at the university, but all students in their first year and the majority of those in their final year are allocated a place.

Although most Durham colleges are not used for teaching purposes, the college is equipped with a moderate library, music practice rooms and public computing facilities. Other welfare and entertainment facilities exist, including a bar, student-run shop, gym, television room, several common rooms, various sports facilities and a coffee shop (Collingwood being the only Durham college to have one). During the summer of 2006, the music rooms were converted into a recording studio, with a new JCR officer position being created to run it.

The college is also a popular venue for academic conferences and other commercial events, often arranged and marketed by Event Durham. The income from these is used by the Colleges' Division to maintain and enhance college bedrooms and other facilities.

In June 2011 contractors began building work on a new gymnasium on the college campus, known as the Mark Hillery Gym. It opened in October 2012.

In 2017, the first in a series of renovations was unveiled. Collingwood now sports its own Multi-Use Games Area (MUGA), informally referred to by students as the "Collingwood Crumb". This can be booked for college sports training sessions, or for casual kickabouts when not in use by one of Collingwood's many teams.

In November 2018, after almost 18 months’ worth of building work, the facilities were completed. These include an expansion and equipment refresh of the Mark Hillery Gym and the replacement of the Bayley Room with the purpose-built Mark Hillery Performing Arts Centre. This performing arts space has a 150-person seated capacity. 

The common room was also fully renovated; it is now equipped with a cinema room, pool tables, multiple televisions, as well as a relocated and fully refitted coffee shop. The college's central social hub, The Stag's Head college bar, was also renovated, bringing a dedicated darts area, conservatory and revamped bar terrace. The green space on the college grounds has also been drastically landscaped with fresh flowers and plants planted across the site.

Collingwood has also recently invested in media suite.

The latest project is a recording studio which is well into the developmental stage of project management and should be built very soon.

Organisation and administration
The Head of College is the Principal. The incumbent Principal is Joe Elliott.

List of Principals
 Peter C. Bayley (1972–1978)
 Anthony Tuck FRHistS (1978–1987)
 Gerald Blake (1987–2001)
 Jane Taylor (2001–2007)
 F. Edward Corrigan, FRS (2008–2011)
 Joe Elliott (2011 – present)

Student life

As with all colleges in Durham, the students organise and democratise themselves by creating and running a body known as the Junior Common Room, or more commonly JCR. All students of the college are JCR members unless they specifically request otherwise. The JCR is led by the Exec Committee, which consists of thirteen elected positions. Two of these positions, those of JCR President and Bar Steward, are sabbatical. 
There is also a Middle Common Room for mostly Postgraduates, who are usually members of the JCR as well.

The college has a number of sports clubs and societies, for example:
The Woodplayers (Collingwood's Drama Society)
Collingwood College Arts Society
Collingwood College Music Society
Collingwood Choir
Collingwood College Fashion Show
 Collingwood College Boat Club
Collingwood College Rugby Football Club
Collingwood College Cricket Club
Collingwood College Association Football Club
Collingwood College Dance Society
Collingwood College Darts Club

Notable alumni

 Lieven Bertels, Musicologist and arts curator
 James Cary, TV and radio writer
 Benjamin Cook, Journalist and author
 Joe Crabtree, drummer of the band Wishbone Ash
 Stephen Davies, Children's Author
 Oliver Eden, 8th Baron Henley, Conservative Politician, former Minister of State
 Peter Elleray, Formula One and Le Mans Race Car Designer
 Mark Elliott, Travel Author
 Jonah Fisher, BBC Journalist
 Tim FitzHigham, British comedian
 Lorraine Heggessey, controller of BBC One 2000–2005
 Rt. Rev Nick Holtham – BA Geog., MA Theol. – Bishop of Salisbury
 Amjad Hussain, Rear Admiral Royal Navy
 Alex Loudon, Warwickshire and England cricketer
 David Kershaw, CEO of M&C Saatchi
 Vincent McAviney, Correspondent, BBC News and ITN
 Rt. Hon Lord Justice Andrew McFarlane – BA Hons Law (1975) – High Court Judge, Lord Justice of Appeal
Stephen Rowbotham, Olympic rower
Jonny Saunders, BBC Radio 2 Sports Presenter
 Will Smith, Durham County Cricket Club cricketer
 David Sproxton, Joint founder of Aardman Animations
Chris Terrill, documentary maker, writer and adventurer
 Richard Watts, Leader of Islington Council

Gallery

See also

Colleges of Durham University

References

Further reading
 Tuck, Anthony. (1997) Collingwood College, University of Durham: A Jubilee History 1972–1997.

Colleges of Durham University
1972 establishments in England
Educational institutions established in 1972